Schoultz, Schöultz, or von Schoultz is a surname. Notable people with the surname include:

Johanna von Schoultz, Finnish-Swedish opera singer
Nils von Schoultz
Solveig von Schoultz
Phillip Schoultz
Robert F. Schoultz

See also